Cataraqui Cemetery is a non-denominational cemetery located in Kingston, Ontario, Canada. Founded in 1850, it predates Canadian Confederation, and continues as an active burial ground. The cemetery is 91 acres in a rural setting with rolling wooded terrain, ponds and watercourses. More than 46,000 individuals are interred within the grounds, and it is the final resting place of many prominent Canadians, including the burial site of Canada's first prime minister, John A. Macdonald. The Macdonald family gravesite, and the cemetery itself, are both designated as National Historic Sites of Canada.

History
The cemetery charter was created during a special act of the Legislative Assembly of the Province of Canada on August 10, 1850. The Cataraqui Cemetery was incorporated as a not-for-profit, non-denominational, and public resting place. Alexander Campbell served as the first president. Architect Frederick Cornell designed the cemetery landscape. Interments increased quickly when the City of Kingston passed a by-law in 1864, preventing burials within the city limits. The gravesite of John A. Macdonald and family plot were recognized as a National Historic Site of Canada on May 19, 1938. Cataraqui Cemetery as a whole was recognized as a National Historic Site of Canada on July 19, 2011.

Notable interments
Cataraqui Cemetery is the final resting place for many notable persons including politicians, businessmen, humanitarians, and authors. The cemetery contains the war graves of 61 service personnel from World War I, and 84 from World War II. Queen's University owns a section that is reserved for interring the remains of those who dedicate their bodies to education and research.

 Leonard Birchall – Royal Canadian Air Force officer
 Thomas Burrowes – Artist and surveyor 
 John Counter – First mayor of the City of Kingston
 Alexander Campbell – Father of Confederation, and a former Lieutenant Governor of Ontario
 Wallace Bruce Matthews Carruthers – Founder of the Canadian Signal Corps
 Richard Cartwright – Judge and politician
 James Alexander Corry – Academic and principal of Queen's University
 William Coverdale – Architect
 John Creighton – Politician and warden
 John James Deutsch – Economist and principal of Queen's University
 Harriet Dobbs – Artist, writer and humanitarian
 George Monro Grant – Minister and principal of Queen's College
 John Hamilton – Politician and cofounder of Queen's University
 George Airey Kirkpatrick – Politician and Lieutenant Governor of Ontario
 Thomas Kirkpatrick – First mayor of the Town of Kingston
 William Leitch – Scientist and principal of Queen's University.
 Evan MacColl – the poet of Loch Fyne
 John A. Macdonald – First Prime Minister of Canada
 Archibald Cameron Macdonell – Police officer and soldier
 Agnes Maule Machar – Author, poet and social reformer
 John Machar – Principal of Queen's University
 William Archibald Mackintosh – Economist and principal of Queen's University
 Thomas McLeod – Scottish sailor who took part in three expeditions to the South Pole
 James Morton – Politician, and businessman
 Edward John Barker Pense – Politician, and newspaper editor
 Guilford Bevil Reed – Canadian medical researcher
 James Richardson – Businessman, founder of James Richardson and Sons, Limited
 James Sampson – Doctor, politician and a founder of Kingston General Hospital
 Charles Sangster – Poet, fellow of the Royal Society
 David Chadwick Smith – Economist and principal of Queen's University
 Henry Smith – Politician and lawyer
 James T. Sutherland – Soldier, and Hockey Hall of Fame member
 Robert Charles Wallace – Geologist, educator, academic administrator
 Zachary Taylor Wood – Commissioner of the North-West Mounted Police, and Yukon Territory

References

Further reading
 Jennifer McKendry (1995). Weep not for me : A photographic essay and history of Cataraqui Cemetery Kingston, Ontario
 John H. Grenville (2000). An illustrated guide to monuments, memorials & markers in the Kingston area  Kingston Historical Society Plaque Committee,  Kingston, Ontario, Kingston Historical Society
 Jennifer McKendry (2003). Into the silent land : historic cemeteries & graveyards in Ontario, Kingston, Ont.,

External links

 History of Catarqui Cemetery
 

Buildings and structures in Kingston, Ontario
Cemeteries in Ontario
National Historic Sites in Ontario
Tourist attractions in Kingston, Ontario